The Toco orogeny was a mountain building affecting the rocks of northern Chile and northwestern Argentina during the Late Carboniferous and Permian. In 1991, researchers Bahlburg and Breitkurz noted that Chilean rocks had a 100 million lull magmatic and metamorphic "lull" from the Silurian to the Carboniferous. They defined the Toco orogeny as the period when active margin conditions returned in the region.

See also
Geology of Chile
Geology of Argentina
List of orogenies

References

Orogenies of South America
Paleozoic orogenies
Carboniferous orogenies
Permian orogenies
Geology of Argentina
Geology of Chile